Jackson Township is a township in Livingston County, in the U.S. state of Missouri.

Jackson Township has the name of Andrew Jackson.

References

Townships in Missouri
Townships in Livingston County, Missouri